Abu Abdullah Muhammad ibn Abi al-Wafa ibn Ahmad al-Adawi al-Mawsili known briefly as Ibn al-Qabaisi (1163–1235), was an Iraqi linguist and poet.

Biography
al-Qabisi was born in Qabaisa a village in Mosul in a family from Isfahan. He studied Arabic grammar under Makki ibn Zabban, and  hadith and Qur'an from Nasrallah al-Wasiti. He was taught for a while in Erbil. He was known for his skills in Arabic linguistics. He died in Aleppo and buried there. Wrote three preludes on Arabic grammar, Morphology and arithmetic, also Al-Tatimat fi al-Tasrif and Al-Hadi fi al-I'irab 'Ila Turuq al-Sawab.

References 

1235 deaths
1163 births